The Philippines competed at the 2000 Summer Paralympics in Sydney. The country was represented by two athletes: Andres Lubin in the men's javelin (F57 category), and Adeline Dumapong in women's powerlifting, in the up to 82.5 kg category.

Lubin achieved a throw of 22.47m, and ranked 11th out of 12.

Dumapong lifted 110 kilograms to win the bronze in her event. She thus became the Philippines' first -and so far only- Paralympic medalist until table tennis paralympian Josephine Medina won another bronze medal in the Rio Paralympics 16 years later. Adeline Dumapong's bronze medal win was a momentous event for the Philippines as this was the first time the country failed to win a single medal in the 2000 Summer Olympics since 1984.

Medallists

Athletics 

Men's Field Events

Powerlifting 

The Philippines qualified 1 athlete for Powerlifting.

See also
Philippines at the Paralympics
Philippines at the 2000 Summer Olympics

References

External links
An Athlete Speaks: Adeline Dumapong Talks About Winning the Paralympics and Her Life Today

Nations at the 2000 Summer Paralympics
2000
2000 in Philippine sport